Dan Paymar is a video poker expert with a background in computer programming and engineering.  He has worked for such companies as Encyclopædia Britannica, Bendix Computer, and Control Data in a career spanning 30 years.  He also helped start Educational Data Systems (later renamed Point 4 Data Corp.), which developed products for the Data General Nova computer. He left Point 4 in 1982 to market his own products for the Apple II computer.

Paymar moved to Las Vegas in 1988 and began working as a poker dealer in a casino.  He started playing video poker on a regular basis and soon developed a directory of the best video poker games.  This directory lead to the 1992 book Video Poker - Precision Play which went through 10 editions.  This began his career as a video poker author and expert, leading to his well-known 1998 book Video Poker - Optimum Play.

For 14 years he edited and published his own newsletter, the Video Poker Times.  He also had a long standing relationship with the Casino Gaming School of Nevada.

The primary difference between Dan and other video poker experts is that he is not a professional gambler, considering himself a skilled recreational player. He devotes his efforts to productive endeavours, including putting his long training and experience in mathematics and programming to work in analysing video poker games. His latest product is "Optimum Video Poker", an analysis and trainer program for Macintosh, Windows and Linux platforms. This is the only such program being marketed by its primary developer, who is also an active player, and it includes more features for bankroll requirements than any other such program, and features a training mode that teaches correct play according to a strategy chart of the player's choice that is displayed alongside the game window.

See also
Bob Dancer
Lenny Frome
Arnold Snyder

External links
Official site
Video Poker 365 profile

American gambling writers
American male non-fiction writers
Living people
Year of birth missing (living people)